Świdnica is a village in Zielona Góra County, Lubusz Voivodeship, in western Poland. It is the seat of the gmina (administrative district) called Gmina Świdnica.

The village has a population of 1,400.

Notable people
Joseph Ignatius Ritter, historian

References

Villages in Zielona Góra County